Nova Xavantina is a municipality in the state of Mato Grosso in the Central-West Region of Brazil. Located in the Legal Amazon and the Araguaia Valley, the Rio das Mortes runs through the center of the municipality. Founded in 1980, today Nova Xavantina serves as an agricultural center, the location of a campus of the State University of Mato Grosso (Unemat), and a tourist destination.

History 
The area now comprising Nova Xavantina was originally inhabited by the Xavante, a Jê-speaking people who once occupied a large territory in eastern Mato Grosso. In 1660, the bandeirante Bartolomeu Bueno da Silva arrived in the area, capturing and enslaving much of the indigenous Xavante population.

The modern municipality can be traced to the 1944 Roncador-Xingu Expedition, part of the larger March to the West policy enacted by Getúlio Vargas during the Estado Novo period. Until this point, the vast majority of Brazil's population lived along the coast, and this policy sought to settle the vast interior, or sertão, generally viewed as an untamed, lawless territorial void. In 1944, the expedition arrived at the Rio das Mortes, building a settlement on the south bank which they named Vila da Xavantina and a settlement on the north bank called Nova Brasília, which were both later incorporated as a district of the Barra do Garças municipality.

During the 1970s, Brazil began a program to transform the region surrounding Vila da Xavantina and the large swath of Amazonian forest to the north to a major agricultural region. They began several agricultural colonization projects, transporting farmers from the south of Brazil to the area, with Vila da Xavantina serving as an administrative center and crucial outpost during the early stages of these projects. The municipalities of Água Boa, Canarana, Querência, Vila Rica, and many others were founded as a result of these colonization projects. In 1971, a bridge across the Rio das Mortes was opened, forming a crucial connection between the much larger city of Barra do Garças to the south and the colonies north of the das Mortes, and connecting the settlements of Nova Brasília and Vila da Xavantina. The populations of both settlements began to grow dramatically throughout the 70s as agricultural production expanded. In 1980, Vila da Xavantina and Nova Brasília were joined to form a new municipality, independent of Barra do Garças, called Nova Xavantina.

Agriculture has continued to expand throughout the 80s, 90s, 2000s, and 2010s, driving continued population growth and economic development in Nova Xavantina. A campus of the State University of Mato Grosso (Unemat) was founded in 1991, providing another reason for immigration to the municipality.

Geography 
Located at 14º40'24"S and 52º21'11"W, Nova Xavantina lies in the cerrado ecoregion. Under the Köppen climate classification, Nova Xavantina has a tropical savanna climate (Köppen: Aw) and is very warm year-round with a rainy season from approximately October to March and a dry season from April to September. It is within the bounds of the Brazilian Legal Amazon. The Rio das Mortes, a major tributary of the Rio Araguaia flows through the center of Nova Xavantina. Though technically in the Amazon Time Zone (UTC-4), Nova Xavantina and other cities in the Araguaia valley unofficially observe Brasília Time (UTC-3). Since the 1980s, Nova Xavantina and the surrounding region have undergone extensive deforestation due to Agricultural expansion. These land-use changes have led to decreases in evapotranspiration and increases in surface temperature across the region, causing the climate to become hotter and drier, with temperatures rising and precipitation decreasing.

Agriculture & Economy 
Nova Xavantina is located in the Brazilian Amazon's major agricultural frontier. Soy is the primary crop, with a second crop (called "safrinha") of corn or sometimes cotton grown after the soy harvest. Cattle ranching is also prevalent in the region, using an extensive amount of land. Due primarily to agricultural expansion, the area has undergone a significant amount of deforestation since the 1980s. 

Another significant economic driver in Nova Xavantina is tourism. Many visitors come to the city from urban centers including Cuiabá, Goiânia, and Brasília, primarily for ecotourism. Several popular waterfalls are located within driving distance from the city center, providing a major source of recreation. There are also several swimming beaches located on the shores of the Rio das Mortes.

Education 
A campus of the State University of Mato Grosso (Unemat) is located in Nova Xavantina, offering undergraduate degrees in Agronomy, Biological Sciences, Civil Engineering, and Tourism, and a graduate degree in Ecology and Conservation.

The Open University of Brazil (UAB) also operates a small campus in Nova Xavantina.

See also
List of municipalities in Mato Grosso

References

Municipalities in Mato Grosso